The Sonkin enterprise multiple (Sonkin ratio) was named after by Paul D. Sonkin, a graduate of Columbia Business School. This ratio can be used when Value investing, and can be calculated using the following formula:

Sonkin ratio = (market capitalization + debt – cash) / (earnings before interest and taxes – tax)

The Sonkin ratio is an alternative to the P/E ratio (price to earnings ratio) and represents the multiple of operating earnings an investor would pay if using the company's cash. A lower multiple means that an investor will pay less to own the after-tax operating earnings of the business.

References

Mathematical finance